Hygrobatoidea is a superfamily of water mites found in North America.

References

Arachnids of North America
Trombidiformes